The Lower Dauphin Street Historic District is a historic district in the city of Mobile, Alabama, United States. It was placed on the National Register of Historic Places on 9 February 1979. The district encompasses all of Dauphin Street from Water Street to Jefferson Street. The boundaries were increased on 19 February 1982, 30 June 1995, and 14 August 1998. The buildings range in age from the 1820s to the 20th century and include the Federal, Greek Revival, Queen Anne, Italianate, and various other Victorian architectural styles.

Gallery
Examples of architecture within the Lower Dauphin Street Historic District:

References

Historic districts in Mobile, Alabama
National Register of Historic Places in Mobile, Alabama
Italianate architecture in Alabama
Queen Anne architecture in Alabama
Federal architecture in Alabama
Greek Revival architecture in Alabama
Historic districts on the National Register of Historic Places in Alabama